Kolopsis is an extinct genus of diprotodontid marsupials from Australia and Papua New Guinea. It contains three species, although K. rotundus may be more closely related to other zygomaturines than to Kolopsis.

†Kolopsis rotundus Plane 1967 (Pliocene, Watut River, Papua New Guinea)
†Kolopsis torus Woodburne, 1967 (Miocene, Alcoota, Northern Territory, Australia)
†Kolopsis yperus Murray, Megirian & Wells, 1993 (Miocene, Alcoota, Northern Territory, Australia)

References

Prehistoric vombatiforms
Miocene mammals of Australia
Miocene marsupials
Prehistoric marsupial genera